Chicharrón en salsa is a popular breakfast and dinner dish in Mexico, made of pork rind cooked in mild spicy salsa, seasoned with coriander. It is often accompanied by refried beans and corn tortillas. There are two versions: chicharrón en salsa verde (in green sauce), and chicharrón en salsa roja (in red sauce).

References

Mexican cuisine
Pork dishes
Mexican pork dishes